Constituency NA-266 (Nasirabad) was a constituency for the National Assembly of Pakistan.

Election 2002 

General elections were held on 10 Oct 2002. Zafarullah Khan Jamali of PML-Q won by 62,107 votes.

Election 2008 

General elections were held on 18 Feb 2008. Mir Taj Muhammad Jamali of PPP won by 76,556 votes.

Election 2013 

General elections were held on 11 May 2013. Zafarullah Khan Jamali of PML-N won by 81,391 votes and became the member of National Assembly.

References

External links 
Election result's official website

NA-266
Abolished National Assembly Constituencies of Pakistan